Shoppers' Chain of Stores is a chain of department stores and supermarkets based in Zamboanga City, Philippines. Shoppers' Chain of Stores started its operations with the opening of Shoppers' Plaza in 1981. The recent branch of Shoppers' Chain of Stores is Shoppers' Center, which was opened in 2008. Its head and sales office is located at the Huylian Building, Tomas Ongpin St., Binondo, Manila where Shoppers' Mart is located, while its warehouses are located in downtown Zamboanga.

Shoppers' branches

Huylian Development Corporation, Inc.

ACLEM Properties, Inc.

Incidents
In 2002, a bomb placed near Shoppers' Central was exploded, having killed one person. While five individuals died on arrival to the hospital, several people were critically wounded. It is said that the bombings were coming from the Abu Sayyaf Group days after the October 11 bombing incident in Bali, Indonesia. Shoppers' Central was one of the stores being heavily affected by bombs. Earlier, another bomb exploded at the Shop-o-Rama area.

In 2011, the Bureau of Internal Revenue- Zamboanga Office ordered the closure of all five Shoppers' stores due to failure of the owners to comply with the payment in 48 hours. Officials of the Bureau of Internal Revenue (BIR) padlocked five big department stores for failing to remit P54 million worth of expanded value added tax (EVAT) to the government for the year 2011. The management of Shoppers' Chain of Stores had hoped that the BIR will allow them to reopen its stores, having the BIR Zamboanga accepted the partial payment of P5 million a week before its closure, coupled with the appeal for reconsideration and recomputation of taxes due. Mayor Celso Lobregat intervened with the employees of Shoppers' stores that led to the lifting of BIR's order after accepting the said partial payment.

See also
List of shopping malls in Zamboanga City
Zamboanga City

References

Retail companies of the Philippines
Companies based in Zamboanga City